McKenney is a small town in Virginia, United States.

McKenney or McKenny may also refer to:

McKenney (surname)
McKenney (bridge), a suit preference signal 
Mount McKenny, a mountain in Antarctica 
McKenny Union, a building of the Eastern Michigan University
McKenny Baronets, a title in the Baronetage of the United Kingdom, created in 1831